The 2008–09 season was the 94th season of the Isthmian League, which is an English football competition featuring semi-professional and amateur clubs from London, East and South East England.

Premier Division

The Premier Division consisted of 22 clubs, including 17 clubs from the previous season, and five new clubs:
 Canvey Island, promoted as play-off winners in Division One North
 Dartford, promoted as champions of Division One North
 Dover Athletic, promoted as champions of Division One South
 Sutton United, relegated from the Conference South
 Tooting & Mitcham United, promoted as play-off winners in Division One South

Dover Athletic became champions five games before the end of the season and were promoted to the Conference South along with play-off winners Staines Town. Harlow Town, Heybridge Swifts and Ramsgate were relegated to the Division One sections, while Margate, who also finished in the relegation zone, were reprieved due to the demotion of clubs higher up the pyramid.

League table

Top scorers

Play-offs

Stadia and locations

1.Hendon left Claremont Road at September and spent the rest of campaign groundsharing with Northwood and Staines Town.

Division One North

Division One North consisted of 22 clubs, including 15 clubs from the previous season, and seven new clubs:
 Chatham Town, transferred from Division One South
 Cheshunt, relegated from the Southern Football League Premier Division
 Concord Rangers, promoted as champions of the Essex Senior League
 East Thurrock United, relegated from the Premier Division
 Hillingdon Borough, transferred from Southern Football League Division One South & West
 Leyton, relegated from the Premier Division
 Thamesmead Town, promoted as champions of the Kent League

Aveley won the division and were promoted to the Premier Division along with play-off winners Waltham Abbey. Witham Town and Hillingdon Borough finished in the bottom two places and left the league.

League table

Top scorers

Play-offs

Stadia and locations

Division One South

Division One South consisted of 22 clubs, including 17 clubs from the previous season, and five new clubs:
 Crowborough Athletic, promoted as champions of the Sussex County League
 Fleet Town, transferred from Southern Football League Division One South & West
 Folkestone Invicta, relegated from the Premier Division
 Godalming Town, transferred from Southern Football League Division One South & West
 Merstham, promoted as champions of the Combined Counties League

Kingstonian won the division and were promoted to the Premier Division along with play-off winners Cray Wanderers. Crowborough Athletic finished bottom of the table and returned to the Sussex County League after only one season in the Isthmian League. Chipstead were reprieved from relegation due to the demotion of clubs higher up the pyramid.

League table

Top scorers

Play-offs

Stadia and locations

League Cup

The Isthmian League Cup 2008–09 was the 35th season of the Isthmian League Cup, the league cup competition of the Isthmian League. Sixty-six clubs took part. The competition commenced on 18 November 2008 and finished on 8 April 2009.

Calendar

Fixtures and results
Fixtures are listed in alphabetical order, not that which they were drawn in.

First round
Four clubs from division Ones participated in the First Round, while all other clubs received a bye to the Second Round.

Second round
The two clubs to have made it through the First Round were entered into the draw with every other Isthmian League club, making sixty-four teams.

‡ – Waltham Forest removed from competition, Witham Town reinstalled

Third round

Fourth round

Quarterfinals

Semifinals

Final

See also
Isthmian League
2008–09 Northern Premier League
2008–09 Southern Football League

References

External links
Official website

2008-09
7